Idool 2003 was the first season of the Belgian version of the Idol series. It was won by Peter Evrard, and followed by Idool 2004. The series was officially launched on 28 September 2002 by Belgian television network VTM. The hosts of the show are Koen & Kris Wauters of the group Clouseau. The jury members were Jean Blaute, Nina De Man, Jan Leyers & Bart Brusseleers.

About
Auditions were held across Flanders in Antwerp, Ghent & Brussels where 100 candidates were chosen to advance to the theatre rounds in Brussels where they were cut to 50 contestants (five groups of ten) to perform live in a piano round semi final, two contestants from each semi final advanced to the liveshows with a studio audience. On 9 May 2003 Peter Evrard from Beerse won with runner up Natalia Druyts placing second.
Finalist Carolin Vyncke, who was pregnant during the contest, named her daughter (who was born later that year) Nina, after jury member Nina De Man.

This season of Idool is also notable having produced so far 3 popular Belgian recording artists in the semi finals:

Hadise Açıkgöz
Udo Mechels – winner of The X Factor.
Johan Waem – popularly known by his stage name, Danzel.

In 2006, the finalists of Idool 2003 are still enjoying success in their country compared to how quickly other countries' Idol competitors last in the music industry. As of July 2006, Peter, Danzel & Udo still have records in the Ultratop 50 singles chart with Wim & Brahim releasing their new CDs in the last month also. But non-of these can hold the massive success Natalia still has.

Several of the Idool 2003 contestants tried out on the Flemish-Belgian Pre-Selection for the Eurovision Song Contest to represent their country and although some of them came quite close, none of them really made it. However Hadise Açıkgöz, who did not made the top 50 but failed to advance to the final 10, represented Turkey in 2009 making her the second contestant from a very successful Idol show to do so, after Jessica Garlick who represented the United Kingdom after appearing in Pop Idol.

Finals

Finalists
(ages stated at time of contest)

Finals Elimination Chart

Live show details

Heat 1 (31 January 2003)

Heat 2 (7 February 2003)

Heat 3 (14 February 2003)

Heat 4 (21 February 2003)

Heat 5 (28 February 2003)

Live Show 1 (14 March 2003)
Theme: My Idol

Live Show 2 (21 March 2003)
Theme: 80s Hits

Live Show 3 (28 March 2003)
Theme: Dutch Songs

Live Show 4 (4 April 2003)
Theme: Film Songs

Live Show 5 (11 April 2003)
Theme: Disco Fever

Live Show 6 (18 April 2003)
Theme: Big Band

Live Show 7 (25 April 2003)
Theme: Latino Hits

Live Show 8: Semi-final (2 May 2003)
Theme: Judge's Choice

Live final (9 May 2003)

References

External links
Peter Evrards Website
Natalias Website
Wim Soutaers Website
Brahims Website
Tom Olaerts Website 
Tabitha Cycons Website
Udos Website
Danzels Website 
Hadises Website
Twinsband (Astrid Roelants) Website

Idool (TV series)
2003 Belgian television seasons